Tire City Museum is located in Tire ilçe (district) in İzmir Province, Turkey, at . The building is the former city hall of Tire. It was built in 1955. After the construction of a newer building for the municipality, the former building was restored and opened as Tire City Museum on 15 October 2014.

Sections

The sections of the museum are as follows:
 Entrance and the upper aisle: Tire etymology and history, Tire municipality and former mayors, Hakan Sepici's collections
 Lower aisle: ethnography (clothes, bath material)
 First hall: famous people of Tire origin such as Seha Gidel, Fuat Mensi Dileksiz, Tanju Okan, Gönül Duman, and Nejat Uygur
 Second hall and the market: endangered handicrafts
 Third hall: annually changing exhibits (in 2016, archaeology) 
 Fourth hall: food culture, copperworks, pharmacy, clock repairing

References

Museums in Turkey
İzmir Province
Tire District
2014 establishments in Turkey